The following is a list of Sri Lankans by ethnicity.

Sinhalese people

Sri Lankan Tamils

Sri Lankan Muslims

Burgher people

Indian Tamils of Sri Lanka

See also
 List of Sri Lankan people

Malay
Bratha
wetti Sri Lankan